H.E. Gensky Grocery Store Building, also known as Capitol City Lodge No. 9 F.& A.M. and Cherry Street Market, is a historic commercial building located at Jefferson City, Cole County, Missouri. It was built in 1915, and is a two-story, rectangular, brick building. It has a front gable roof and features a two-tiered, recessed front porch supported by continuous, slender brick columns.  The building exemplifies Missouri-German craftsmanship.

It was listed on the National Register of Historic Places in 2001.

References

Commercial buildings on the National Register of Historic Places in Missouri
Commercial buildings completed in 1915
Buildings and structures in Jefferson City, Missouri
National Register of Historic Places in Cole County, Missouri
Grocery store buildings
Masonic buildings in Missouri